Gong Oh-kyun (Hanja: 孔五均; born September 10, 1974) is a former South Korean football player and a professional coach. Currently he's working as the manager of Vietnam  national under-23 football team.

Club career 
He played for Daejeon Citizen for 10 seasons and appeared in 291 games for this club, scored 38 goals and made 18 assists. In 2009, he also joined the Australian semi-professional club Sunshine Coast FC.

Managerial career 
In May 2022, he was appointed as the manager of Vietnam  national under-23 football team.
In December 2022, he was appointed as the manager of Malaysian Super League Team MPKB-BRI FC

Personal life 
He has a Teaching Certificate of Physical Education, Level 2 and Asian Football Confederation Coaching License Level A (eligible to coach up to professional level) and Bachelor of Physical Education, Kwandong University (graduated in 1997), Graduate School of Public Health, Konyang University (graduated in 2006), publishing a thesis researching "Study on improvement of dietary patterns and intake status of health functional foods in adult soccer players."

Career statistics

Club

References

External links
 

1974 births
Living people
Association football forwards
South Korean footballers
Daejeon Hana Citizen FC players
Gyeongnam FC players
K League 1 players